Jean-Jacques Cologni (born in La Réole, on 15 January 1951) is a French former rugby league player and coach. He played as second-row.

Biography
He debuted for La Réole, with which he debuted at senior level, later joining XIII Catalan in 1972 until his retirement as player in 1986. With XIII Catalan, he won the French Championship in 
1979, 1982, 1983, 1984 and 1985.  Due to his club performances, he is called up several times for the France national team between 1973 and 1983, taking part at the 1977 Rugby League World Cup.
After his player career, he took a coaching career with XIII Catalan, winning the French Championship in 1987.

Personal life
His son, Aurélien Cologni is also a rugby league player and coach. Outside the field, he worked as a firefighter.

Honours

As player
Team honours:
Winner of the Rugby League European Championship: 1977 (France)
Winner of the French Championship: 1979, 1982, 1983, 1984 and 1985 (XIII Catalan)
Winner of the Lord Derby Cup: 1976, 1978, 1980 and 1985 (XIII Catalan)
Runner-up at the French Championship: 1978. 1981 and 1986 (XIII Catalan)
Runner-up at the Lord Derby Cup: 1977, 1981 and 1983 (XIII Catalan)

As coach
Team honours:
Winner of the French Championship: 1987 (XIII Catalan)
Runner-up at the Lord Derby Cup: 1987 (XIII Catalan)

References

External links
Jean-Jacques Cologni at rugbyleagueproject.com

1951 births
Living people
France national rugby league team players
French rugby league coaches
French rugby league players
Rugby league second-rows
XIII Catalan players
Sportspeople from Gironde
XIII Catalan coaches